Bater is a surname. Notable people with the name include:
Arthur James Bater (1889–1969), British politician and farmer
Cafer Bater  (1913–94), Turkish watercolour painter
James Bater (born 1980), Welsh rugby union player and dentist
Phil Bater (born 1955), Welsh association football player and manager